South Carolina Highway 377 (SC 377) is a  state highway in the U.S. state of South Carolina. The highway connects Lane and Kingstree.

Route description
SC 377 begins at an intersection with SC 375 (Gordon Road) south-southwest of Lane, Williamsburg County. It travels to the north-northeast, paralleling railroad tracks, and enters the city limits of Lane. In town, it passes a U.S. Post Office. It curves to the northeast and leaves Lane. The highway has an intersection with U.S. Route 521 (US 521; Thorntree Road). Just after that intersection, it crosses over the Black River. The highway curves to the north-northeast and curves to the north-northwest. Upon entering Kingstree, SC 377 passes Kingstree Senior High School and Williamsburg Technical College. Then, it passes Williamsburg Regional Hospital. On the northwestern corner of the hospital, it intersects SC 527 (Nelson Boulevard). Two blocks later, it meets its northern terminus, an intersection with SC 261 (East Main Street).

History

Major intersections

See also

References

External links

 
 Mapmikey's South Carolina Highways Page: SC 377

377
Transportation in Williamsburg County, South Carolina